Pieter Elbers (born 11 May 1970) is a Dutch airline executive who serves as the CEO of IndiGo since 2022. He had been president and CEO of the Netherlands' flag carrier airline, KLM, from 2014 until his appointment as CEO of IndiGo.

Early years
Elbers was born in Schiedam, in the province of South Holland. He attended elementary school at De Singel Primo Schiedam and studied at Fontys University of Applied Sciences in Venlo where he received a Bachelor in Logistics Management. Afterwards, he did a master's degree in Business Administration at the Open University of the Netherlands. He also studied abroad in New York City and Beijing.

Career
Elbers graduated at Fontys University located in Venlo. 

Elbers started his career with KLM in 1992 as supervisor aircraft loading at the Schiphol hub, followed by a number of managerial positions in The Netherlands as well as abroad for six years, amongst which those of general/sales manager in Japan, Greece and Italy. After he returned to The Netherlands, he became SVP network & alliances, before he joined the board of managing directors in 2011 as chief operating officer.

Elbers was one of the pivotal members of KLM that led them to signing with airline alliance SkyTeam. He is a member of the executive committee of the Air France-KLM Group. Furthermore, he is a member of the supervisory board of Marfo B.V. In addition, he is a member of the board of the Confederation of Netherlands Industry and Employers.

On 15 October 2014 KLM Royal Dutch Airlines announced that Elbers had been appointed by the KLM supervisory board as president and chief executive officer of KLM, replacing Camiel Eurlings. During his time in office, the Dutch state purchased a 14% stake in the company in 2019, in an effort to protect the Netherlands' interests. In early 2022, KLM announced that Elbers would not serve a third term and instead resign by May 2023.

In June 2022, IndiGo announced the appointment of Elbers as its new CEO, replacing Ronojoy Dutta, who had retired. On 6 September 2022, Elbers formally took charge of IndiGo as the CEO.

References

1970 births
Living people
People from Schiedam
Dutch businesspeople
Dutch corporate directors
Dutch chief executives in the airline industry
Air France–KLM